Miapetra Kumpula-Natri (born 19 May 1972) is a Finnish politician who currently serves as a Member of the European Parliament (MEP) from Finland. She is a member of the Social Democratic Party, part of the Progressive Alliance of Socialists and Democrats. She has been a Member of the European Parliament since 2014.

Political career
Kumpula-Natri has been a Member of the European Parliament since the 2014 European elections. She has since been serving on the Committee on Industry, Research and Energy (ITRE). On the committee, she has served as the Parliament's rapporteur on European Union roaming regulations (2017) and on the European strategy for data (2020). 

Since 2021, Kumpula-Nari has been part of the Parliament's delegation to the Conference on the Future of Europe. In addition to her committee assignments, she is also part of the Parliament's delegation for relations with the United States; she previously belonged to the Parliament's delegations to the EU-Moldova Parliamentary Association Committee and to the Euronest Parliamentary Assembly from 2014 until 2019.

Kumpula-Natri is a member of the European Parliament Intergroup on Climate Change, Biodiversity and Sustainable Development, the European Parliament Intergroup on Anti-Racism and Diversity, the European Parliament Intergroup on Fighting against Poverty and the European Parliament Intergroup on LGBT Rights.

Following the 2019 elections, Kumpula-Natri was part of a cross-party working group in charge of drafting the European Parliament's four-year work program on digitization.

According to Politico Europe, Kumpula-Natri was a candidate to become United Nations Secretary-General António Guterres's first-ever Envoy on Technology in 2021; instead, the role went to Chilean diplomat Fabrizio Hochschild Drummond.

References

1972 births
Living people
MEPs for Finland 2014–2019
MEPs for Finland 2019–2024
21st-century women MEPs for Finland
Social Democratic Party of Finland MEPs
People from Vaasa